Chinnaponnu (also credited as Chinna Ponnu or Chinnaponnu Kumar) is a folk and playback singer from the state of Tamil Nadu, India.

Early life
Chinnaponnu was born in Suranam, a small village in Sivagangai district, Tamil Nadu, India. She started performing in temple festivals and churches when she was 13 years old. Soon afterwards, she began singing professionally in the troupe of fellow folk artist Kottaisamy, whom she credits as a mentor. Later her voice brought the attention of K.A. Gunasekaran, a leading researcher on the folk arts and folk songs of Tamil Nadu, who also had close ties to the Communist Party of India. Gunasekaran helped promote her performances in different parts of the state.

Career
In 2004, she broke into the Tamil film industry as a playback singer with the song "Vazhthuren Vazhthuren" in the hit film Chandramukhi, starring Rajinikanth and Jyothika. This led to television appearances and interest from other music directors.

In the year 2010, she won the Edition Award 2010 for the song "Theeka Theeka" from the film Suriyan Satta Kalloori directed by S.S. Pandian. In the same year she was also one of the artists featured in the theme song for the World Classical Tamil Conference 2010, composed by A. R. Rahman, with a video directed by Gautham Vasudev Menon.

In 2010 and 2011, her troupe was one of the headlining acts at the Chennai Sangamam festival. In June 2011, she appeared on MTV Coke Studio television series in the episodes 'Vethalai' and 'Tere Naam' along with singer Kailash Kher and Papon.

In 2012, she entered the Telugu film industry with the song Pattuko Pattuko in the hit movie Bus Stop with music by JB and G. Anil.

Nakku Mukka
Her next major hit, "Nakku Mukka", was featured in the 2008 film Kadhalil Vizhunthen. For this song she was honoured with the Kannadasan Award for best folk singer in a Tamil film. A different version of "Nakku Mukka" (with changed lyrics) was featured in a short Times of India ad film entitled A Day in the Life of Chennai, which won two Gold Lions at Cannes in 2009. The song even featured in the Bollywood hit film The Dirty Picture.

Bigg Boss Tamil

She was a contestant in Bigg Boss (Tamil season 5). She got eliminated on Day 28 due to the lack of public votes.

Discography

Cassettes
Suriya Thoranam, her first audiocassette, released by Father Bakianathan.

Thannane, with songs written and composed by K.A. Gunasekaran, released by the CPI.

Chinnaponnu recorded many other cassettes in her childhood and young adulthood which were sold and circulated informally. A CD re-release of the best of these tracks is planned.

Solo CDs
Marikkozhunthae (Symphony Records, 2005)

Thannane Thannane (Symphony Records, 2009)

Playback singer

Personal life
In 1990 Chinnaponnu was married to composer and percussionist Selva Kumar (who generally performs under the name Kumar) at Thanjavur Mariamman Temple. They have composed music and performed together ever since.

In 2008, Chinnaponnu was involved in a serious car accident, in which her driver was killed. She sustained head injuries and was hospitalised for several weeks, but was performing and recording again within a few months.

In 2021, Chinnaponnu participated in the reality show Bigg Boss Tamil Season 5 and became the only aged female contestant to survive in the house for 4 weeks.

In 2023, Chinnaponnnu is participating in Zee Tamil show Super Jodi.

References

External links
 
 https://web.archive.org/web/20110302074117/http://chinnaponnu.com/index.html
 http://theinspirationroom.com/daily/2009/a-day-in-the-life-of-chennai/

Indian women folk singers
Indian folk singers
Indian women playback singers
Tamil playback singers
Tamil folk singers
Tamil singers
Singers from Tamil Nadu
People from Sivaganga district
20th-century Indian singers
20th-century Indian women singers
21st-century Indian women singers
21st-century Indian singers
Women musicians from Tamil Nadu
Bigg Boss (Tamil TV series) contestants